Andy Minh Trieu (born 10 December 1984), commonly known as Andy Trieu, is an Australian host, actor and martial artist. He is a three-time Australian Champion Martial Artist.

Early life
Trieu was born in Canberra to Vietnamese parents. He attended Sacred Hearts Primary School and Marist College. He graduated from a double degree in Business and International Relations at the Australian National University in 2009. He was formerly a Science Communicator. He has a younger, and older brother.

Career
Originally a martial artist, Andy Trieu expanded his repertoire from competing in tournaments to performing in roles across stage and screen. He has acted and presented on the Nine Network  on programmes such as Kitchen Whiz as the Kitchen Ninja, minor role in Rescue: Special Ops and Crime Investigations. He has also appeared on SBS network shows Houso's, Bollywood Star and is a current a host on SBS PopAsia He also acted in the 2015 ABC TV comedy Maximum Choppage as Fury, and in the Australian zombie comedy cult classic Me and My Mates vs the Zombie Apocalypse alongside comedians Jim Jefferies, Greg Fleet and Alex Williamson. Trieu was a runner up for the national search for hosts on ABC3 and was a finalist in CLEO's Top 50 Bachelors. Trieu is also an advocate and ambassador for All Together Now Australia, and the National Stroke Foundation.

Filmography

See also
http://www.sbs.com.au/movies/article/2017/02/12/sbs-pop-asias-andy-trieu-his-life-next-jackie-chan

References

External links
 
 

1984 births
Living people
Australian people of Vietnamese descent
Australian male television actors
People from Canberra
Australian martial artists